Oliver Robert McBurnie (born 4 June 1996) is a professional footballer who plays as a striker for  club Sheffield United and the Scotland national team.

After playing youth football for Leeds United, McBurnie began his career with Bradford City, spending two loan spells at Chester. He later signed for Swansea City, spending time on loan at Newport County, Bristol Rovers and Barnsley.

Born in England to a Scottish father and mother, he represents Scotland at international level, making his senior debut in March 2018.

Early life
McBurnie was born in Leeds, West Yorkshire. He grew up in the suburb of Garforth, attending Garforth Academy. He still lived in Garforth as of July 2020.

Club career

Bradford City
McBurnie started at Leeds United's academy from a young age, playing with the likes of Lewie Coyle and Tyler Denton in the youth setup, before he was released at under 14s level. He joined Bradford City's academy, but played for Manchester United in the 2013 Milk Cup.

McBurnie was given a three-year professional contract by Bradford on 23 August 2013. In November 2013, Bradford City manager Phil Parkinson stated that he was considering involving McBurnie with the club's first team squad. He made his professional debut on 9 November 2013, in the FA Cup, appearing as a substitute. He later spoke about his desire for further first-team action, and made his first senior start on 26 December 2013, at the age of 17.

He was offered a new contract by the club at the end of the 2013–14 season. McBurnie later spoke about his first season as a professional, describing it as "ridiculous." He also spoke about his excitement ahead of the 2014–15 season. In September 2014 manager Phil Parkinson told McBurnie to "step up to the plate" and make the most of the first-team appearances he was making following an injury to regular started James Hanson. In October 2014 Parkinson hinted that McBurnie would be sent out on loan.

McBurnie joined Chester on a one-month loan deal on 22 January 2015. He was recalled early, returning to Bradford on 20 February following injuries to first-team players. Manager Phil Parkinson thought the loan spell had been beneficial to McBurnie's development. He re-joined Chester on loan on 6 March.

Swansea City
On 13 July 2015, McBurnie joined Swansea City on a three-year deal for an undisclosed fee, later revealed to be £250,000. Later that month he made his first appearances for Swansea in under-21 matches in Holland.

In November 2015 he joined League Two club Newport County on an initial one-month loan. McBurnie made his debut for Newport on 28 November in a league game against Luton Town, scoring a hat-trick after coming on as a 58th-minute substitute. While the loan had been earlier extended until January 2016, he was recalled by Swansea on 24 December 2015. On 7 March 2016, he joined Bristol Rovers on loan for the remainder of the 2015–16 season.

On 23 August 2016, McBurnie scored twice on his debut for Swansea's first team in the second-round 2016–17 EFL Cup tie against Peterborough United. The match finished 1–3 in Swansea's favour. His performance was praised by ex-Swansea player Warren Feeney. McBurnie won the Premier League 2 'Player of the Month' award for January 2017. In November 2016, McBurnie signed a one-year contract extension at the Liberty Stadium until June 2019.

McBurnie appeared as a substitute in Swansea's first three matches of the 2017–18 Premier League. On 31 August 2017, the last day of the English summer transfer window, a loan to Championship club Barnsley for the rest of the season was agreed. However, despite training with Barnsley the transfer was not completed, due to an issue with the paperwork and he returned to Swansea. Upon returning to Swansea under Paul Clement he played for Swansea's Under 23's scoring 10 goals in 7 games, before earning a recall to the first team under new manager Carlos Carvalhal, where he made 12 appearances including starting against Liverpool and Newcastle.

On 31 January 2018, he moved on loan to Barnsley, then managed by Paul Heckingbottom. He scored his first goal for Barnsley in a 1–1 draw with Sheffield Wednesday on 10 February 2018. After scoring six goals in his first eight games at Barnsley, McBurnie was named the Championship Player of the Month for February and also received a call up to the Scotland squad for his form. On 28 April 2018, McBurnie won Barnsley's Player Of The Year award.

McBurnie returned to Swansea at the end of the season, and stated that he would use his Championship experience to help fire them to promotion. After speculation strongly linking him with moves to either Leeds United or Rangers, on 12 July 2018 he signed a new three-year contract extension at Swansea City with the option of a fourth year. McBurnie scored his first league goal for Swansea in their first match of the 2018–19 season a 2–1 victory against Sheffield United.

Sheffield United
In July 2019, McBurnie was the subject of a transfer bid from Sheffield United, which was rejected by Swansea. Later that month Sheffield United increased their bid, which Swansea accepted.

On 2 August 2019, McBurnie signed for Sheffield United on a four-year deal for a fee of £17.5 million, potentially rising to £20 million. The fee set a new club record for Sheffield United and a new record for a transfer involving a Scottish player, until it was beaten a few days later by Kieran Tierney's £25 million move from Celtic to Arsenal. McBurnie's former club Bradford City were set to receive a "windfall" from his sale, later confirmed to be around £2 million.

On 24 November 2019, he scored the equaliser as Sheffield United drew 3–3 with Manchester United at Bramall Lane. The goal was challenged by VAR but upheld. He finished the 2019–20 season as Sheffield United's joint highest goalscorer along with Lys Mousset on six goals. In April 2022 he suffered a foot injury and was ruled out for "months".

On 26 August 2022 he scored his first league goal in 43 games (since December 2020), and his first in any competition for 11 months, scoring the equaliser in a 1–1 draw away at Luton Town.

International career

Youth career
In September 2013, McBurnie was called up for a training camp by the Scotland under-19 national team. McBurnie was called up to the Scotland under-19 squad in November 2014. He made his debut in a 1–1 draw against the Netherlands. in April 2015 he was praised by under-19 manager Ricky Sbragia, and subsequently by club manager Phil Parkinson. He scored 1 goals in 4 appearances for the under-19s.

McBurnie moved up to the under-21 team in 2015, and he made 12 appearances at that level, scoring 2 goals.

Senior career
McBurnie was selected for the senior national squad for the first time in March 2018, by new Scotland manager Alex McLeish. He made his full international debut on 23 March, in a 1–0 defeat to Costa Rica. He then took part in Scotland's mini tour of Latin America (defeats to Peru and Mexico) two months later.

In March 2019, following "his breakthrough campaign for Swansea", McBurnie said he was ready to "stake a claim for a Scotland striking role".

In September 2019 McBurnie stated his commitment to the national team following a video posted on social media. His dedication to the Scottish national team was questioned again in August 2020, after he withdrew from the squad but then played in a club match. He was defended by Scotland manager Steve Clarke. McBurnie was further criticised in November 2020, and was again defended by Clarke.

In May 2021 he was not selected to the Scotland squad for the delayed UEFA Euro 2020 tournament due to injury.

Personal life
McBurnie was a boyhood fan of Scottish football club Rangers.

In October 2019 McBurnie was charged with drink-driving. In July 2020 he was fined £28,500 and banned from driving for 16 months.

In January 2020, McBurnie was warned by the Football Association for his conduct amongst Swansea City supporters whilst attending the South Wales derby when he allegedly made a rude gesture towards Cardiff City fans.

In February 2021 McBurnie offered to pay for the funeral of a 26-year-old Swansea City fan who died.

On 10 May 2021, Sheffield United announced they would investigate a video being circulated on social media which appeared to show McBurnie involved in a fight. North Yorkshire Police said that a 24-year-old man had been arrested in connection with an incident where a 21-year-old victim sustained facial injuries. The following month, North Yorkshire Police said that the case had been concluded, with a penalty notice and caution issued to two of the men involved in the incident.

In May 2022 police announced an investigation into a video allegedly showing McBurnie 'stamping' on a fan, with McBurnie saying he was trying to step over the person. In June 2022, McBurnie and Sheffield United teammate Rhian Brewster were charged with common assault by Nottinghamshire Police "in relation to disorder at the conclusion of a game at the City Ground on 17 May 2022". Both players "strenuously denied" the allegations. The charges against Brewster were dropped in July 2022, but remained against McBurnie. In August 2022 it was announced that the case against McBurnie would proceed to trial, after he pleaded not guilty to an assault charge. On 15 December 2022, McBurnie was found not guilty of the charge.

Career statistics

Club

International

Honours
Individual
EFL Championship Player of the Month: February 2018
Barnsley Player of the Year: 2017–18

See also
List of Scotland international footballers born outside Scotland

References

External links

Profile at sufc.co.uk

1996 births
Living people
Footballers from Leeds
English footballers
Scottish footballers
Scotland youth international footballers
Scotland under-21 international footballers
Scotland international footballers
Association football forwards
Bradford City A.F.C. players
Chester F.C. players
Swansea City A.F.C. players
Newport County A.F.C. players
Bristol Rovers F.C. players
Barnsley F.C. players
Sheffield United F.C. players
English Football League players
National League (English football) players
Premier League players
English people of Scottish descent
People from Garforth
People educated at Garforth Academy
People acquitted of assault